Belgium was represented by Bob Benny, with the song "September, gouden roos", at the 1961 Eurovision Song Contest, which took place on 18 March in Cannes, France. The song was chosen in the national final on 29 February. Benny had previously represented Belgium in the 1959 contest. Future Belgian entrant Jacques Raymond (1963 and 1971) finished runner-up in the final.

Before Eurovision

Finale van de Belgische Bijdrage tot het Songfestival
Finale van de Belgische Bijdrage tot het Songfestival was the national final format developed by BRT in order to select Belgium's entry for the Eurovision Song Contest 1961. The competition was held on 29 February 1961 at the Amerikaans Theater in Brussels and hosted by Aimée De Smet.

Competing entries
BRT opened a submission period for artists and composers to submit their songs. 381 entries were submitted, from which the broadcaster selected 6 for the contest. Among the participants were Louis Neefs and Rina Pia; however, they withdrew their songs from the contest due to the fact that they thought that their songs were "not that good to perform". Ultimately, they were replaced with Luc Van Hoeselt and Enny Denita.

Final
The national final was held on 29 February 1961 at 21:00 CET at the Amerikaans Theater in Brussels and hosted by Aimée De Smet. Six songs took part with the winner being chosen by an "expert" jury. It is not known by what system the songs were scored.

At Eurovision 
On the night of the final Bob Benny performed 11th in the running order, following Switzerland and preceding Norway.

At the close of the voting "September, gouden roos" had received only 1 point (from Luxembourg), placing Belgium joint last (with Austria) of the 16 competing entries. The Belgian jury split its 10 points between Norway (5), Italy (4) and the United Kingdom (1).

Voting 
Every country had a jury of ten people. Every jury member could give one point to his or her favourite song.

Trivia
 According to Dutch newspaper Het vrije volk, conductor Francis Bay was not happy that Belgium didn't receive a single point from the Dutch juries, while the French-speaking countries were "forming a block" according to him. He proposed to set up a voting block with the Netherlands and the Scandinavian countries.

References 

1961
Countries in the Eurovision Song Contest 1961
Eurovision